The Indonesia men's national basketball team represents the Republic of Indonesia in international basketball competitions. The governing body of the team is the Persatuan Bola Basket Seluruh Indonesia (Indonesian Basketball Association – PERBASI).

Its biggest success was the gold medal at the 1996 South East Asian Championship.

Team Indonesia is one of the major teams in Southeast Asia. The team finished among the top-four teams in Asia at the 1967 Asian Basketball Championship. At the 1996 SEABA Championship, Indonesia was the dominant country and won the gold medal.

At the 1997 SEA Games in Jakarta, Indonesia failed to get a medal. Then, two years later Indonesia won the bronze medal at the Brunei 1999 SEA Games.

Indonesia participated at the 2009 FIBA Asia Championship as well, which was held 6–16 August 2009, in Tianjin, China. They were able to qualify for the said tournament by placing second in the 2009 SEABA Championship held from 6–9 June 2009.
At the FIBA Asia Championship, only the top 3 qualified for the World Basketball Championships. For these events, the head coach of the team was Rastafari Horongbala.
At the FIBA Asia Championship 2009, Indonesia finished 15th, leaving behind Sri Lanka.
On individual performances, Kelly Purwanto and Isman Thoyib finished among the tournament's top performers. Purwanto finished in the top ten in steals per game, Thoyib finished in the top ten in blocks per game.
Indonesian basketball-icon Mario Wuysang was not able to represent his country at that event due scheduling conflicts (the final four of the Indonesian IBL was scheduled about the same time as this Asian Championship). 

Indonesia will co-host the 2023 FIBA Basketball World Cup along with Philippines and Japan although its national team did not finish at least among the top eight in the 2022 FIBA Asia Cup and failed to qualify.

History
In the 1930s, even though it had not officially become an independent country, several cities in Indonesia already had local basketball clubs. After the proclamation of independence on 17 August 1945, basketball games began to be widely known in the cities that were involved in rivalries as Yogyakarta vs. Solo. The game of basketball was played for the first time at the national level in 1948 in Solo at the National Sports Week I (PON I). Although this organization does not yet have a national sports master, it can get a quite lively welcome, both in terms of viewers and from the participants themselves.

Three years after that, on 23 October 1951, the Indonesian Basketball Association was formed and named Persatuan Basketball Seluruh Indonesia. In 1955, due to the improvement of the name in accordance with Indonesian rules, the federation was renamed Persatuan Bola Basket Seluruh Indonesia (PERBASI). Perbasi was later accepted as a member of FIBA in 1953, and a year later, for the first time Indonesia sent a team to compete in the 1954 Asian Games in Manila.

Kit
2015–2021: Hype Clothes

2021–present: Nuraga

Sponsor
2016: Hi-Test

2021–present: Sinar Mas Group

Competitive records

Summer Olympics

FIBA Basketball World Cup

FIBA Asia Cup

Asian Games

FIBA Asia Challenge

SEABA Championship

SEABA Cup

Islamic Solidarity Games

Southeast Asian Games

Coaching staff

Current roster 

Final roster at 2022 FIBA Asia Cup

Past rosters

2015 Southeast Asian Games

2015 SEABA Championship

2016 SEABA Cup

2017 Southeast Asian Games

2017 SEABA Championship

2018 Asian Games

2019 Southeast Asian Games

2021 Southeast Asian Games

Naturalized players

Head coach position

See also
 Indonesian Basketball Association
 Indonesia women's national basketball team
 Indonesia national under-18 basketball team
 Indonesia national under-16 basketball team
 Indonesia national 3x3 team

References

External links
Indonesia Basketball Records at FIBA Archive
Asia-basket - Indonesia Men National Team 
Indonesian Basketball Association "PERBASI" Official Website

Videos
Basketball Men's Malaysia vs Indonesia (Day 7) | 28th SEA Games Singapore 2015 Youtube.com video

 
Men's national basketball teams
1954 establishments in Indonesia
National sports teams of Indonesia